De Kroon der Schande  is a 1918 Dutch silent drama film directed by Maurits Binger, and produced by the Hollandia company.

Cast
 Willem van der Veer - De heer Newton
 Annie Bos - Jess Newton
 Adelqui Migliar - Bruce, Lord Ravenhurst
 Lola Cornero - Deborah Plunt
 Jan van Dommelen - Lord Ravenhurst
 Paula de Waart - Lady Ravenhurst
 Medardo Migliar - Hubert Clave

References

External links
 

Dutch silent feature films
1918 films
Dutch black-and-white films
1918 drama films
Films directed by Maurits Binger
Dutch drama films
Silent drama films